Villeneuve-Loubet is a commune in the Alpes-Maritimes department in the Provence-Alpes-Côte d'Azur region in southeastern France. It lies between Cagnes-sur-Mer and Antibes, at the mouth of the river Loup, ten kilometres west of central Nice.

It was created by the joining two old villages: the old village of Villeneuve inland and the village of Loubet on the shore of the Mediterranean Sea. Its inhabitants are called Villeneuvois.

Economy
Villeneuve-Loubet is at the same time a seaside resort and part of the technology cluster or technopole of nearby Sophia Antipolis. Many companies of the tertiary sector being installed in the city.

Culture
Villeneuve-Loubet is the birthplace of the famous 19th century provençal chef, restaurateur, and culinary writer Auguste Escoffier, the author of the Guide Culinaire and the founder of French haute cuisine. Villeneuve-Loubet was also, from 1920 onwards, the home of Maréchal Philippe Pétain (1856–1951), the "Hero of Verdun" in World War I and chief of state of the Nazi-collaborationist État Français, commonly known as Vichy France, in World War II.

The writer and historian Jules Bertaut (1877–1959) died in Villeneuve-Loubet.
The sculptor Richard Aurili worked in Villeneuve-Loubet

Marshall Philippe Pétain purchased a house called L'Ermitage in Villeneuve-Loubet circa 1920.

Villeneuve-Loubet was also the site of a battle in World War II when it was liberated by the First Special Service Force on August 26, 1944. The tower of the castle was damaged by a shell fired by the US Navy, and dozens of soldiers from both sides were killed or wounded. In 2006, the bodies of fourteen Germans who were killed during the fighting were discovered in a mass grave near the town by a local medical student.

Saint Marc Church (15th century): The stained glass was created by the artist painter Pier Lecolas in 2006.

Population

International relations
The commune is twinned with:
 Forlimpopoli, Italy

See also
Communes of the Alpes-Maritimes department

References

Communes of Alpes-Maritimes
Alpes-Maritimes communes articles needing translation from French Wikipedia